Xaysetha  or Saysetha  is a river town in Attapeu Province, in southern Laos. It is the capital of Saysetha District. It is several kilometres east of the provincial capital of Attapeu and is connected by Lao National Highway 11.

References

Populated places in Attapeu province